Navlya may refer to several places in Russia.

Urban localities
Navlya, Bryansk Oblast, a work settlement in Navlinsky District of Bryansk Oblast

Rural localities
Navlya, Oryol Oblast, a selo in Navlinsky Selsoviet of Shablykinsky District of Oryol Oblast

Rivers
Navlya (river), a tributary of the Desna in Bryansk Oblast and Oryol Oblast